Rø Transmitter is a facility for FM- and TV-transmission at Rø, Denmark, situated on Bornholm island. It uses as antenna tower a 315.8 metre tall guyed mast.
The top of the mast of Rø Transmitter is 431.3 metres above sea level. It is therefore the highest point in Denmark (except Faroe Islands and Greenland).

See also
 List of masts
 List of tallest structures in Denmark

References

Towers in Denmark
Radio masts and towers in Europe